The Bomber Command Museum of Canada, formerly the Nanton Lancaster Society Museum, is an aviation museum in Nanton, Alberta. The museum opened in 1986 and was founded to protect and restore Avro Lancaster FM159, one of only 17 remaining in the world. It has since grown to include a large collection of aircraft, many of which were used during the War by the British Commonwealth Air Training Plan. A virtual tour of the museum is available HERE.

History 
The Nanton Lancaster Society was formed in 1985 with the mission of preserving the town's Avro Lancaster, which had been on outdoor display since 1960. The following year, the society officially began displaying the aircraft as a museum. In 1991 the NLS completed a building to house the plane, and throughout the 1990s the museum acquired a large collection of aircraft to complement the Lancaster. Following the opening of the original building, the museum has expanded in 1998, 2002, and 2007. The museum includes a library, archive, and restoration shop. It is presently working to add second hangar for its collection.

Since 1986, the museum's Lancaster has undergone a full restoration, and all four engines are operational, and the aircraft can taxi under it;s own power, one of only 4 similar Lancasters in the world. The Society elected to restore the aircraft using the livery of Lancaster FM-159 (F2-T) "T for Tommy," the Lancaster in which Ian Bazalgette was killed on 4 August 1944. In 1990 the Society held a dedication ceremony for the aircraft. Among attendees were Mrs. Ethel Broderick, Ian's sister, F2-T crew members Chuck Godfrey and George Turner, as well as 407 Squadron's commanding officer, Colonel Terry Chester.

In 2005 the museum dedicated its Bomber Command Memorial, and in 2010 changed its name to the Bomber Command Museum of Canada. In addition to its airplanes and vehicles, the museum has an extensive collection of engines, art, and other related objects.

Projects 
Bomber Command Museum continues to develop its collection. Currently, in conjunction with the City of Calgary and the Calgary Mosquito Society, it is restoring Mosquito RS700 for display. Additionally, it is working with Halifax 57 Rescue to recover Handley Page Halifax HR871 from off the coast of Sweden, which it will restore and display. This would make the museum one of only four in the world to have a Halifax.

Collection

Airplanes

Vehicles

Gallery

References 

Aerospace museums in Alberta
Aviation history of Canada
Military and war museums in Canada